Anatomy of Hell is a 2004 erotic drama film written and directed by Catherine Breillat, based on her 2001 novel Pornocratie. According to Breillat, Anatomy of Hell is a "sequel" to Romance.

Plot
Teetering on the edge of overwhelming ennui, a lonely and dejected woman pays a gay man to join her for a daring, four-day exploration of sexuality in which both reject all convention and smash all boundaries while locked away from society in an isolated estate. Only when the man and woman confront the most unspeakable aspects of their sexuality will they have a pure understanding of how the sexes view one another.

Cast
 Amira Casar as the woman
 Rocco Siffredi as the man
 Catherine Breillat as the narrator
 Alexandre Belin as blow-job lover 1
 Manuel Taglang as blow-job lover 2
 Jacques Monge as man in bar
 Claudio Carvalho as boy with the bird
 Carolina Lopes as little girl
 Diego Rodrigues (billed as 'Diogo Rodriques') as little boy playing doctor
 João Marques as boy playing doctor
 Bruno Fernandes as little boy playing doctor
 Maria Edite Moreira as pharmacist 1
 Maria João Santos as pharmacist 2

Production
The film was adapted by writer/director Breillat from her novel Pornocracy. The sexually explicit film stars Amira Casar as "the woman" and porn star Rocco Siffredi as "the man". Leonard Maltin summarizes: "After attempting suicide in the bathroom of a gay disco, a woman hires the man who rescues her to spend four nights in her company, challenging him to 'watch me where I'm unwatchable'."

Breillat allowed Casar to use a body double in the explicit sex scenes. Siffredi's performance, however, is all his own work.

Siffredi recalled that when Breillat described one scene to him, she took his penis in her hand and explained to Amira how she should play the scene.

Reception
The film polarized critics. Leonard Maltin gave the film zero stars and said the film was "homophobic" and "unintentionally funny". Roger Ebert stated: "I remember when hard-core first became commonplace, and there were discussions about what it would be like if a serious director ever made a porn movie. The answer, judging by Anatomy of Hell, is that the audience would decide they did not require such a serious director after all."

BBC film critic Jamie Russell gave the film four stars out of five:

 "The plot is hardcore thin: a woman (Amira Casar) cruises a gay club and pays broody stud (porn star Rocco Siffredi) to spend four nights with her. A challengingly explicit delve into the female body (often quite literally), it's a unique cinematic example of feminist existential porn.... Yet perversely, it's also one of the most groundbreaking films in recent memory in terms of both the explicitness of its sexuality and its commitment to such an austere intellectual discourse. No wonder Rocco looks so shell-shocked: this is sex not as comedy, but as the deepest, darkest male nightmare."

The film went on to win Best Feature Film at the Philadelphia Film Festival.

Review aggregator website Rotten Tomatoes reports a 26% rating based on 35 critics with an average rating of 3.56/10. The website's critics consensus reads: "Ponderous, pretentious, and – considering the subject matter – dull." On Metacritic, the film has a 29 out of 100 rating based on 19 critics, indicating "generally unfavorable reviews".

References

External links
 
 
 
 
 

2004 films
2004 drama films
2004 LGBT-related films
2000s avant-garde and experimental films
2000s erotic drama films
2000s feminist films
2000s French-language films
Films based on French novels
Films directed by Catherine Breillat
Films shot in Portugal
French avant-garde and experimental films
French erotic drama films
French feminist films
French LGBT-related films
Gay-related films
LGBT-related drama films
Portuguese drama films
Portuguese LGBT-related films
2000s French films